Phymaturus vociferator is a species of lizard in the family Liolaemidae. It is from Chile.

References

vociferator
Lizards of South America
Reptiles of Chile
Endemic fauna of Chile
Reptiles described in 2004